The Kuala Linggi Bridge is a bridge border of Negeri Sembilan and Malacca crossing Linggi River, Malaysia. The bridge is located near Dutch Fort in Melaka side. It was officially opened on 10 July 1990 by fourth Malaysian Prime Minister, Mahathir Mohamad.

See also
 Transport in Malaysia

Bridges in Melaka
Bridges in Negeri Sembilan
Bridges completed in 1990
Box girder bridges